A materials property is an intensive property of a material, i.e., a physical property that does not depend on the amount of the material. These quantitative properties may be used as a metric by which the benefits of one material versus another can be compared, thereby aiding in materials selection.

A property may be a constant or may be a function of one or more independent variables, such as temperature. Materials properties often vary to some degree according to the direction in the material in which they are measured, a condition referred to as anisotropy. Materials properties that relate to different physical phenomena often behave linearly (or approximately so) in a given operating range . Modeling them as linear functions can significantly simplify the differential constitutive equations that are used to describe the property.

Equations describing relevant materials properties are often used to predict the attributes of a system. 

The properties are measured by standardized test methods. Many such methods have been documented by their respective user communities and published through the Internet; see ASTM International.

Acoustical properties
Acoustical absorption
Speed of sound
Sound reflection
Sound transfer
Third order elasticity (Acoustoelastic effect)

Atomic properties
Atomic mass: Applies to all elements. The average mass of the atoms of an element measured in atomic mass unit.
Atomic number: Applies to pure elements only
Atomic weight: Applies to individual isotopes or specific mixtures of isotopes of a given element

Chemical properties

Corrosion resistance
Hygroscopy
pH
Reactivity
Specific internal surface area
Surface energy
Surface tension

Electrical properties
Capacitance
Dielectric constant
Dielectric strength
Electrical resistivity and conductivity
Electric susceptibility
Electrocaloric coefficient
Electrostriction
Magnetoelectric polarizability
Nernst coefficient (thermoelectric effect)
Permittivity
Piezoelectric constants
Pyroelectricity
Seebeck coefficient

Magnetic properties
Curie temperature
Diamagnetism
Hall coefficient
Hysteresis
Magnetostriction
Magnetocaloric coefficient
Magnetothermoelectric power (magneto-Seebeck effect coefficient)
Magnetoresistance
Maximum energy product
Permeability
Piezomagnetism
Pyromagnetic coefficient
Spin Hall effect

Manufacturing properties
Castability: How easily a quality casting can be obtained from the material
Machinability rating
Machining speeds and feeds

Mechanical properties
Brittleness: Ability of a material to break or shatter without significant deformation when under stress; opposite of plasticity, examples: glass, concrete, cast iron, ceramics etc.
Bulk modulus: Ratio of pressure to volumetric compression (GPa) or ratio of the infinitesimal pressure increase to the resulting relative decrease of the volume
Coefficient of restitution: The ratio of the final to initial relative velocity between two objects after they collide. Range: 0-1, 1 for perfectly elastic collision.
Compressive strength: Maximum stress a material can withstand before compressive failure (MPa)
Creep: The slow and gradual deformation of an object with respect to  time. If the s in a material exceeds the yield point, the strain caused in the material by the application of load does not disappear totally on the removal of load. The plastic deformation caused to the material is known as creep. At high temperatures, the strain due to creep is quite appreciable.
Ductility: Ability of a material to deform under tensile load (% elongation). It is the property of a material by which it can be drawn into wires under the action of tensile force. A ductile material must have a high degree of plasticity and strength so that large deformations can take place without failure or rupture of the material. In ductile extension, a material that exhibits a certain amount of elasticity along with a high degree of plasticity.
Durability: Ability to withstand wear, pressure, or damage; hard-wearing
Elasticity: Ability of a body to resist a distorting influence or stress and to return to its original size and shape when the stress is removed
Fatigue limit: Maximum stress a material can withstand under repeated loading (MPa)
Flexibility: Ability of an object to bend or deform in response to an applied force; pliability; complementary to stiffness
Flexural modulus
Flexural strength: Maximum bending stress a material can withstand before failure (MPa)
Fracture toughness: Ability of a material containing a crack to resist fracture (J/m^2)
Friction coefficient: The amount of force normal to surface which converts to force resisting relative movement of contacting surfaces between material pair  
Hardness: Ability to withstand surface indentation and scratching (e.g. Brinell hardness number)
Malleability: Ability of the material to be flattened into thin sheets under applications of heavy compressive forces without cracking by hot or cold working means.This property of a material allows it to expand in all directions without rupture.
Mass diffusivity: Ability of one substance to diffuse through another
Plasticity: Ability of a material to undergo irreversible or permanent deformations without breaking or rupturing; opposite of brittleness
Poisson's ratio: Ratio of lateral strain to axial strain (no units)
Resilience: Ability of a material to absorb energy when it is deformed elastically (MPa); combination of strength and elasticity
Shear modulus: Ratio of shear stress to shear strain (MPa)
Shear strength: Maximum shear stress a material can withstand
Slip: A tendency of a material's particles to undergo plastic deformation due to a dislocation motion within the material. Common in Crystals.
Specific modulus: Modulus per unit volume (MPa/m^3)
Specific strength: Strength per unit density (Nm/kg)
Specific weight: Weight per unit volume (N/m^3)
Surface roughness: The deviations in the direction of the normal vector of a real surface from its ideal form
Tensile strength: Maximum tensile stress of a material can withstand before failure (MPa)
Toughness: Ability of a material to absorb energy (or withstand shock) and plastically deform without fracturing (or rupturing); a material's resistance to fracture when stressed; combination of strength and plasticity
Viscosity: A fluid's resistance to gradual deformation by tensile or shear stress; thickness
Yield strength: The stress at which a material starts to yield plastically (MPa)
Young's modulus: Ratio of linear stress to linear strain (MPa)

Optical properties

Absorbance: How strongly a chemical attenuates light
Birefringence
Color
Electro-optic effect
Luminosity
Optical activity
Photoelasticity
Photosensitivity
Reflectivity
Refractive index
Scattering
Transmittance

Radiological properties
Neutron cross-section
Specific activity
Half life

Thermal properties
Binary phase diagram
Boiling point
Coefficient of thermal expansion
Critical temperature
Curie point
Ductile-to-brittle transition temperature
Emissivity
Eutectic point
Flammability
Flash point
Glass transition temperature
Heat of vaporization
Inversion temperature
Melting point
Thermal conductivity
Thermal diffusivity
Thermal expansion
Triple point
Vapor pressure
Specific heat capacity

See also
Physical property
Strength of materials
Supervenience
List of thermodynamic properties

References

Chemical properties
Materials science
Physical quantities